Amber Settle is an American computer scientist and professor of education and theory in the department of Computer Science at DePaul University in Chicago, Illinois. She is known for her work in computer science education and her continuing service and leadership in Association for Computing Machinery (ACM) Special Interest Group on Computer Science Education (SIGCSE). She is also known for her work on computational thinking.

Education 
She received a bachelor of science in mathematics and a bachelor of arts in German from the University of Arizona. She also received a master of science and a doctor of philosophy in theoretical computer science from the University of Chicago.

Career
She served on the SIGCSE Board for six years, during which she served as Treasurer for three. SIGCSE is the premier international organization for computer science educators serving over 2700 members from more than 60 countries.

She is served as Past Chair on the ACM SIGCSE Board from 2016-2019.

Awards and honors
In 2011, she was awarded the ACM Women Senior Member Award for her leadership, technical, and professional accomplishments.

In 2015, she received the DePaul School of Computing Spirit of Inquiry Award for her work on Computational Thinking across the Curriculum.

Selected publications
 2002. Settle, Amber, and Janos Simon. Smaller solutions for the firing squad. Theoretical Computer Science 276.1-2 (2002): 83-109.
 2014. Linda Mannila, Valentina Dagiene, Barbara Demo, Natasa Grgurina, Claudio Mirolo, Lennart Rolandsson, Amber Settle,  Computational thinking in K-9 education, Proceedings of the working group reports of the 2014 on innovation & technology in computer science education conference, Pages 1–29, ACM, 2014.
 2016. Undergraduate Students' Perceptions of the Impact of Pre-College Computing Activities on Choices of Major, ACM Transactions on Computing Education, 2016.

See also
SIGCSE Technical Symposium on Computer Science Education

References

External links
 Amber Settle, Professor of Computer Science, DePaul
 ACM Special Interest Group on Computer Science Education

American computer scientists
DePaul University faculty
Living people
University of Chicago alumni
American women computer scientists
Year of birth missing (living people)
American women academics
21st-century American women